David Turpel (born 19 October 1992) is a Luxembourger international footballer who plays for Progrès Niederkorn, as a forward.

Career
Born in Luxembourg City, Turpel has played club football for Etzella Ettelbruck, F91 Dudelange, Virton and Swift Hesperange.

He made his international debut for Luxembourg in 2012.

Career statistics

International goals
Scores and results list Luxembourg's goal tally first.

Notes

References

Living people
1992 births
Association football forwards
Luxembourgian expatriate footballers
Luxembourgian footballers
Luxembourg international footballers
Luxembourg National Division players
Challenger Pro League players
FC Etzella Ettelbruck players
F91 Dudelange players
R.E. Virton players
FC Swift Hesperange players
Luxembourgian expatriate sportspeople in Belgium
Expatriate footballers in Belgium